Sarcosperma paniculatum is a tree in the family Sapotaceae. The specific epithet  means "loosely branched", referring to the flowers.

Description
The flowers are yellow to greenish-white.

Distribution and habitat
The habitat of Sarcosperma paniculatum is secondary forests to open areas from  elevation. The species is native to Sumatra, Peninsular Malaysia, Borneo, the Lesser Sunda Islands, Sulawesi, the Maluku Islands, New Guinea and the Philippines.

References

paniculatum
Trees of Malesia
Trees of New Guinea
Plants described in 1895